Enzo Nicolás Jacques Célestine, commonly known as Enzo Célestine, (born 24 July 1997) is a French professional footballer who plays as a forward for Romanian Liga I side FC Argeș Pitești. Célestine started his career in France at FC Martigues, then playing for Saint-Louis Neuweg and CA Pontarlier, before signing a contract in Belgium, with URSL Visé. After he left Visé, remained in Belgium and signed for AFC Tubize, before moving back in France, where he played for teams such as Hyères FC and FC Sète 34. In the summer of 2022, Célestine signed a contract with Romanian top-flight club FC Argeș Pitești.

References

External links
 
 

1997 births
Footballers from Paris
French sportspeople of Italian descent
Living people
French footballers
Association football forwards
Championnat National 2 players
Championnat National players
Belgian National Division 1 players
Challenger Pro League players
Liga I players
Serie D players
FC Martigues players
FC Saint-Louis Neuweg players
URSL Visé players
A.F.C. Tubize players
R. Wallonia Walhain Chaumont-Gistoux players
Hyères FC players
S.S.C. Giugliano players
FC Sète 34 players
FC Argeș Pitești players
French expatriate footballers
French expatriate sportspeople in Belgium
Expatriate footballers in Belgium
French expatriate sportspeople in Italy
Expatriate footballers in Italy
French expatriate sportspeople in Romania
Expatriate footballers in Romania